Dadash Hodge oglu Bunyadzade (1888–1938) was the chairman of the Council of People's Commissars of the Transcaucasian Socialist Federative Soviet Republic from 14 March 1930 to 23 October 1932. During the Great Purge, he was arrested, accused of plotting against the Soviet state, sentenced to death and executed.

The Azerbaijan State Institute of National Economy was named after Dadash Bunyadzade.

See also
Prime Minister of Azerbaijan

References 

1888 births
1938 deaths
People from Baku Governorate
Azerbaijani communists
Azerbaijani revolutionaries
Executed politicians
Old Bolsheviks
Great Purge victims from Azerbaijan
Soviet Azerbaijani people
Members of the Communist Party of the Soviet Union executed by the Soviet Union